Utricularia wightiana is a small to medium-sized, probably perennial carnivorous plant that belongs to the genus Utricularia. It is endemic to India and is mostly confined to Nilgiri and Kodaikanal hills of Tamil Nadu state and Attappadi hills of Kerala state of India. It was originally described by Peter Taylor in 1986. It was named in honor of Robert Wight.

See also 
 List of Utricularia species
 ENVIS Centre - Kerala

References 

wightiana
Flora of Kerala
Flora of Tamil Nadu
Carnivorous plants of Asia